Aston Flamville Manor is a house in the village of Aston Flamville, Leicestershire. The front of the house was rebuilt in the 18th century, with five bays and two storeys.

Notes and references

Sources
 Pevsner, Nikolaus (1960). The Buildings of England: Leicestershire and Rutland (Harmondsworth: Penguin Books)

Country houses in Leicestershire